The International Contender is a single-handed high performance sailing dinghy, designed by Bob Miller, latterly known as Ben Lexcen, (Australia) in 1967 as a possible successor to the Finn dinghy for Olympic competition.

The Contender is recognised as an International Class by World Sailing, the governing body of sail boat racing, which administers the class rules.

Background

"Single-handed" means sailed by only one person. The boat has a trapeze which allows the sailor to use their weight more effectively. The design of the boat does not favour sailors within a narrow or extreme size or weight range, past champions have ranged from 60 kg to more than 90 kg. While physical fitness, agility and strength are advantageous, good technical sailing skills and experience can count for more.

Sailors wishing to master the Contender must learn how to trapeze and steer the boat at the same time, and how to move about the boat while keeping it level. As part of race tuning, the Contender mast is commonly raked well aft, which results in restricted space between the boom and deck. Tacking consequently requires technique and practice to avoid getting stuck under the boom. Sailing the boat level at all times (except in very light winds) is fastest and reduces capsizes, which can happen fast if the boom dips into the water. There is a trade-off between raking the mast far aft and keeping the kicker (boom vang) tight at all times (which is faster) and the higher probability of capsizing due to this less forgiving set up. Unlike older and heavier dinghy designs, the Contender requires the centerboard to be lowered at least somewhat to avoid quick capsizes when reaching and running in a breeze.

Class rule changes
The class rules are overseen by the International Contender Association. Proposals for changes to the rules are written down and presented to the class members during the Annual General Meeting (AGM). Before a rule change is taken into effect, the proposal needs to be approved by 2/3 of the member attending the AGM. If the proposal is approved, a next voting round will be done using a postal ballot. If a majority approves, the proposal will go to World Sailing for their approval. If this passes, the rules are updated and effected.
Notable changes to the class rules are for instance:
 allow other materials than aluminium for masts; proposal in 2000  and a rule change in 2002
 allow loose footed sail; proposal in 2000  and a rule change in 2002
 allow other material than aluminium for the boom; proposal in 2002  and a rule change in 2003 
The Contender Microsite on World Sailing has a section with the latest class rules.

Events

World Championships

European Championships

|2021
|, Warnemünde
|

References

External links

Class associations
 International Contender Association
 British Contender Association
 Danish Contender Association
 Dutch Contender Association
 German Contender Association
 Italian Contender Association
 French Contender Association

Others
 International Contender Class Rules 2019
 World Sailing Contender Microsite
 World Sailing

Dinghies
Classes of World Sailing
1960s sailboat type designs
Sailing yachts designed by Ben Lexcen